Temple of Neptune may refer to:
An 18th century misnomer for the Second Temple of Hera (Paestum)
The Temple of Neptune (Rome)